The Little Finger is a mountain in the Five Fingers Group, a group of summits on the divide between Pitt Lake and Coquitlam Lake and north of Widgeon Lake, in British Columbia, Canada.

Notes

References
 
 
 

Little Finger
Pacific Ranges
One-thousanders of British Columbia
New Westminster Land District